Luther Samuel Livingston (July 6, 1864December 24, 1914) was an American bibliophile and scholar. He was the first curator of the Harry Elkins Widener Collection at Harvard University, but died just a few weeks after being appointed.

Sources
Luther S. Livingston, 1864–1914
https://www.jstor.org/stable/24292228?seq=1#page_scan_tab_contents
https://www.americanantiquarian.org/proceedings/44806581.pdf

Harvard University faculty
1864 births
1914 deaths